Haakon Lind (August 11, 1906 – June 28, 1955) was a Norwegian boxer who competed in the 1928 Summer Olympics.

In 1928 he was eliminated in the first round of the lightweight class after losing his fight to Franz Dübbers.

External links
Part 3 the boxing tournament

1906 births
1955 deaths
Lightweight boxers
Olympic boxers of Norway
Boxers at the 1928 Summer Olympics
Norwegian male boxers
20th-century Norwegian people